Tkaczyk is a Polish occupational surname meaning "weaver". Notable people with this surname include:

 Andrew Tkaczyk, Polish American musician
 Cecilia Tkaczyk, Polish American politician
 Dariusz Tkaczyk, Polish musician
 Grzegorz Tkaczyk (born 1980), Polish handball player
 Roman Tkaczyk (born 1954), Polish gymnast
 Waldemar Tkaczyk, Polish musician

See also
 
 Tkacz

Polish-language surnames